The Big Potato is a statue in Xylofagou, Cyprus. It is 4.9 feet (4.9 meters) tall and made of fibreglass. It cost  €8,000 to design and make, and is placed at the centre of the village, (next to the Olympos Xylophagou stadium), to commemorate the villages' potato growing history, and was created ahead of their annual potato festival. It is shaped after the Spunta Potato breed, which is grown in Xylofagou and is famous for its abnormally long shape. Plans were made to include a road sign pointing towards the statue to attract tourists. Seats next to the monument for photographs are also planned, as well as a potato museum and a Guinness World Record attempt for frying the most French fries at one time. It is guarded at night to prevent vandalism. George Tasou stated that he was inspired by the The Big Fish in Belfast, and wanted to commemorate Xylofagou's potato history in a similar way. The Deputy Ministry of Tourism in Cyprus welcomed the project.

Criticism 
The statue received mixed reviews. While it was received well by many, the statue was also hit with a lot of negative publicity, criticised for its phallic resemblance. While some locals in Xylofagou liked the statue, some were upset with its creation, due to the nature of its appearance provoking negative reaction across social media, believing it was bringing the village into disrepute globally. Community leader George Tasou defended his decision to create the statute the Cyprus Mail, stating that "Xylofagou has a long legacy of potato growing and used to be the main potato grower in Cyprus. This helped the village grow into the 10,000-strong community it is today". He later stated that anyone seeing anything else other than a potato was guilty of a dirty mind, and was unfazed by criticism due to it bringing publicity to the town. Euripides Evriviades, former Cypriot ambassador to the UK, satirically mocked the statute on Twitter, stating "Other countries have instantly recognizable monuments. Now we have ours", comparing it to other landmarks such as the Eiffel Tower and the Statue of Liberty.

Two months after its erection, the statue was toppled by vandals on 1 January 2022 at around 3:30 am, causing €4,000 in damages. It was confirmed to not be weather related, the perpetrators unknown. It was re-erected afterwards.

In December, around the Christmas season, the statue is decorated to resemble a traditional Christmas tree, with a star placed at the top, lights draped to the floor, and tinsel surrounding its base. In 2022, it was covered in Christmas lights.

References 

Potatoes
Statues
Monuments and memorials in Cyprus